Pauline Ngan Po-ling is a Chinese businesswoman who was elected to the 13th National People's Congress in the 2017 election in Hong Kong.

References 

Living people
21st-century Chinese women politicians
21st-century Chinese politicians
Delegates to the 13th National People's Congress from Hong Kong
Female members of the National People's Congress
Hong Kong racehorse owners and breeders
Hong Kong women in business
Year of birth missing (living people)
21st-century Hong Kong women politicians